Area marina protetta Capo Rizzuto is a small scale coastal marine reserve located in  the Italian province of Crotone, in the comuni of Isola Capo Rizzuto and Crotone. Its official centre is located at 38°58'N / 17°13'E. 

It is divided into three zones, each with its own level of protection.
 Zone-A, Integral Reserve - Fully closed for all disturbing activities, including scuba diving, bathing, fishing and shipping. Only scientific research, emergency services and trips organised by the management board are allowed in the area.
 Zone-B, General Reserve - The zones directly surrounding the integral reserves. Most activities are allowed as long as they adhere to some basic limitations, e.g. no motor sailing faster than five knots, no anchoring or mooring. Fishing activities are limited to residential fishing with lines and rods. 
 Zone-C, Partial Reserve - The remainder of the reserve adheres mostly to the same limitations as the general reserve but with a less stringent regime. Motor sailing is limited to ten knots.

It is in the easternmost part of Calabria and leads into the waters of the Ionian Sea.

Protection 
The area is a Specially Protected Area under the Barcelona Convention and a number of national acts, most noticeably as a Natural Marine Protected Area (decree of February 19, 2002). The Italian Ministry of Environment is the supervising body, and day-to-day management is placed with the province of Crotone.

It first protection came in 1982 when parts of the current reserve were one of the first two marine protected sites in Italy. On December 27, 1991, the reserve was officially established.

External links 
 Map of the reserve
 Capo Rizzuto Management Board
 Area Marina Protetta Capo Rizzuto - Government data sheet on the park

Environment of the Mediterranean
Marine parks of Italy
Province of Crotone